James Elwin Glass (September 10, 1919 – February 8, 1972) was an American professional basketball player. He played for the Fort Wayne Zollner Pistons of the National Basketball League in 1944–45, averaged 0.5 points per game, and won the NBL championship.

Glass attended the University of Toledo for one year and played on the freshman basketball team. He also fought in World War II.

References

1919 births
1972 deaths
American men's basketball players
American military personnel of World War II
Basketball players from Fort Wayne, Indiana
Centers (basketball)
Fort Wayne Zollner Pistons players
University of Toledo alumni